Maryborough Airport may refer to:

 Maryborough Airport (Queensland), in Maryborough, Queensland, Australia
 Maryborough Airport (Victoria), in Maryborough, Victoria, Australia